The Swedish ice hockey champions is a title awarded annually to the winning playoff team of the top-tier ice hockey league in Sweden, which currently is Swedish Hockey League (SHL). It was first awarded to IK Göta in 1922, the championship's inaugural year. The championship's present SHL format did not take into effect until the league was originally formed for the 1975–76 season under the name of Elitserien. A team who wins the Swedish Championship is awarded the Le Mat Trophy. Djurgårdens IF holds the most titles in history with 16 titles. The most recent Swedish Champions are Frölunda HC, who won their fourth title in club history in 2016.

Before 1953, the Swedish champions were determined through a standalone tournament, the Swedish Ice Hockey Championship, where teams could submit their participation. In other words, the leagues were not connected with the Swedish Championship during this period. Between 1953 and 1955, the winner was decided through matches between the winners of Division 1 Norra and Division 1 Södra. From 1956 to 1965, the Swedish champions was the winner of a second round group stage following Division 1. In the years of 1966 and 1967 a play-off was played between Division 1 teams and the 1968 season saw a return to second round group stage. In the 1975–76 season, Elitserien was started and the winner of Elitserien (later SHL) play-off became Swedish ice hockey champion.

Lars Björn and Tord Lundström have the most titles, with nine each.

Below is a list of the players awarded medals.

Players

A

Bengt Åkerblom - Djurgården 1989
Tommy Albelin - Djurgården 1983
Ruben Allinger - Djurgården 1926
Folke Andersson - Djurgården 1926
Karl-Erik Andersson - Djurgården 1950, 1954, 1955
Ola Andersson - Djurgården 1989
Sune Andersson - Djurgården 1926
Sven Andersson - Djurgården 1954
Hans Andersson-Tvilling - Djurgården 1950, 1954, 1955, 1958, 1961
Stig Andersson-Tvilling - Djurgården 1950, 1954, 1955, 1958, 1959, 1960
Wilhelm Arwe - Djurgården 1926

B

Rolf Berggren - Djurgården 1958, 1959, 1960, 1961
Bo Berglund - Djurgården 1983
Charles Berglund - Djurgården 1989, 1990, 1991, 2000, 2001
Lennart Berglund - Djurgården 1954, 1955
Tommy Björkman - Djurgården 1958, 1959, 1960, 1961, 1962, 1963
Lars Björn - Djurgården 1950, 1954, 1955, 1958, 1959, 1960, 1961, 1962, 1963
Arto Blomsten - Djurgården 1989, 1990, 1991
Arne Boman - Djurgården 1958
Bengt Bornström - Djurgården 1958
François Bouchard - Djurgården 2001
Dag Bredberg - Djurgården 1983

C

Björn Carlsson - Djurgården 1983
Jan Chmelar - Djurgården 2000
Jan Claesson - Djurgården 1983

D

Christian Due-Boje - Djurgården 1989, 1990, 1991

E

Per Eklund - Djurgården 2000
Håkan Eriksson - Djurgården 1983
Joakim Eriksson - Djurgården 2000, 2001
Thomas Eriksson - Djurgården 1983, 1989, 1990, 1991
Tomaz Eriksson - Djurgården 1989

F

Nichlas Falk - Djurgården 2000, 2001
Jonas Finn-Olsson - Djurgården 2001
Leif Fredblad - Djurgården 1962
Edvin Frylén - Djurgården 2001

G

Johan Garpenlöv - Djurgården 1989, 1990, 2001
Mikael Good - Djurgården 1983
Stefan Gustavson - Djurgården 1991

Z

Mikael Håkanson - Djurgården 2000
Lars Hallström - Djurgården 2000
Jörgen Holmberg - Djurgården 1983
Martin Holst - Djurgården 2001

J

Magnus Jansson - Djurgården 1991
Gösta Johansson - Djurgården 1950, 1954, 1955, 1958,  1959, 1960
Kent Johansson - Djurgården 1983, 1990
Mikael Johansson - Djurgården 1989, 1990, 1991, 2000, 2001
Nils Johansson - Djurgården 1926
Thomas Johansson - Djurgården 2000
Yngve Johansson - Djurgården 1950, 1954, 1955, 1958, 1959, 1962
Anders Johnson - Djurgården 1989, 1990, 1991
Ola Josefsson - Djurgården 1989, 1990, 1991

K

Kyösti Karjalainen - Djurgården 2001
Ernst Karlberg - Djurgården 1926
Yngve Karlsson - Djurgården 1950, 1954, 1955, 1958, 1959, 1962
Kenneth Kennholt - Djurgården 1989, 1990, 1991
Espen Knutsen - Djurgården 2000
Mikko Konttila - Djurgården 2000
Niklas Kronwall - Djurgården 2000, 2001

L

Bengt Larsson - Djurgården 1950, 1955, 1958
Bo Larsson - Djurgården 1983
Calle Lilja - Djurgården 1958, 1959, 1960, 1961, 1962
Karl-Erik Lilja - Djurgården 1983, 1990
Erik Lindgren - Djurgården 1926
Fredrik Lindquist - Djurgården 1991
Johan Lindstedt - Djurgården 1991
Martin Linse - Djurgården 1983

M

Mikael Magnusson - Djurgården 2000, 2001
Torsten Magnusson - Djurgården 1954
Ove Malmberg - Djurgården 1958, 1959, 1960, 1961, 1962, 1963
Hans Mild - Djurgården 1958, 1959, 1960, 1961, 1962, 1963
Pontus Molander - Djurgården 1983
Tommy Mörth - Djurgården 1983

N

Tord Nänzén - Djurgården 1983
Lennart Nierenburg - Djurgården 1950
Patrik Nilson - Djurgården 2000, 2001
Kent Nilsson - Djurgården 1989
Peter Nilsson - Djurgården 1989, 1990, 1991
Björn Nord - Djurgården 2000
Claes Norström - Djurgården 1989
Per Nygårds - Djurgården 1991

O

Carl-Göran Öberg - Djurgården 1961, 1962, 1963
Jens Öhling - Djurgården 1983, 1989, 1990, 1991
Jimmie Ölvestad - Djurgården 2000, 2001
Vladimír Országh - Djurgården 2001
Kristofer Ottosson - Djurgården 2000, 2001

P

Stefan Perlström - Djurgården 1983,  1989
Joakim Persson - Djurgården 1991
Ronnie Pettersson - Djurgården 2000, 2001
Marcus Ragnarsson - Djurgården 1991

R

Rolf Ridderwall - Djurgården 1983, 1989, 1990
Petter Rönnquist - Djurgården 1991
Åke Rydberg - Djurgården 1958, 1959, 1960, 1961, 1962, 1963

S

Andreas Salomonsson - Djurgården 2001
Gösta Sandberg - Djurgården 1958, 1959, 1961, 1962, 1963
Hans Särkijärvi - Djurgården 1983
Christian Sjögren - Djurgården 2000, 2001
Stig Sjöstam - Djurgården 1955
Leif Skiöld - Djurgården 1960, 1961, 1962, 1963
Håkan Södergren - Djurgården 1983, 1989, 1990, 1991
Walter Söderman - Djurgården 1926
Tommy Söderström - Djurgården 1990, 1991, 2000
Orvar Stambert - Djurgården 1989, 1990, 1991
Hans Stelius - Djurgården 1950
Hans Stergel - Djurgården 1963
Roland Stoltz - Djurgården 1958, 1959, 1960, 1961, 1962, 1963
Mats Sundin - Djurgården 1990
Kurt Svensson - Djurgården 1963

T

Mikael Tellqvist - Djurgården 2000, 2001
Michael Thelvén - Djurgården 1983
Björn Thorsell - Djurgården 1983
Kurt Thulin - Djurgården 1959, 1960, 1962, 1963
Daniel Tjärnqvist - Djurgården 2000, 2001
Mathias Tjärnqvist - Djurgården 2000, 2001
Sven Tumba - Djurgården 1954, 1955, 1958, 1959, 1960, 1961, 1962, 1963

V

Jan Viktorsson - Djurgården 1989, 1990, 1991

W

Peter Wallén - Djurgården 1989
Mats Waltin - Djurgården 1983, 1990
Gösta Westerlund - Djurgården 1963
Mikael Westling - Djurgården 1983
Lars-Göran Wiklander - Djurgården 2000
Eddie Wingren - Djurgården 1959, 1960, 1961, 1962, 1963

Y

Mats Ytter - Djurgården 1989

Z

Bertz Zetterberg - Djurgården 1950, 1954, 1955, 1958
Magnus Zirath - Djurgården 2000

References

See also
List of Swedish ice hockey champions
List of Swedish ice hockey junior champions
List of SHL seasons